Ivan Deriuhin (25 November 1928 – 10 January 1996) was a Soviet modern pentathlete and Olympic Champion. He competed at the 1956 Summer Olympics in Melbourne, where he won a gold medal in the team competition (together with Aleksandr Tarasov and Igor Novikov, and placed ninth in the individual competition.

Together with Albina Deriugina, he raised the award-winning Soviet gymnast Irina Deriugina.

References

1928 births
1996 deaths
Ukrainian male modern pentathletes
Soviet male modern pentathletes
Olympic modern pentathletes of the Soviet Union
Modern pentathletes at the 1956 Summer Olympics
Olympic gold medalists for the Soviet Union
Olympic medalists in modern pentathlon
People from Zmiiv
Medalists at the 1956 Summer Olympics
Sportspeople from Kharkiv Oblast